Bekker was first ever mentioned in the Torah in the form of the clan of the Bekkerrites. The addition of '-rite' to a surname indicates plural or a group of people.
The original ancestor to South African Bekker's left Prussia in 1644 from Königsberg.
A Bekker husband and wife were sent to their deaths from Trompsø, Norway to the concentration camps, WWII.
Bekker is also Dutch and Low German occupational surname, bekker is a regional form of Dutch bakker ("baker"). Notable people with the surname include:

Amore Bekker (born 1965), South African radio personality
Andries Bekker (born 1983), South African rugby player
Andriëtte Bekker (born 1958), South African statistician
August Immanuel Bekker (1785–1871), German philologist and critic
Balthasar Bekker (1634–1698), Dutch divine and author of philosophical and theological works
Byron Bekker (born 1987), South African speedway rider
Carel N Bekker (born 1983),South African Karate Champion, Conservationist and Engineering Technician
Clarence Bekker (born 1968), Dutch Eurodance singer known as CB Milton
Christiaan Bekker (born 1961), International artist
Christopher Bekker (born 1964), South African born musician based in Australia
Daniel Bekker (1932–2009), South African Springbox Heavyweight, Common Wealth Champion and Silver Olympic medalist.
Elizabeth Bekker (1738–1804), Dutch writer known by her married name Betje Wolff
Ernst Immanuel Bekker (1827–1918), German jurist and professor
Hendrik Bekker (1661–1722), Dutch Governor of Ceylon
Hennie Bekker (born 1934), Zambian-born musician and composer based in Canada
Jaap Bekker Springbok Rugby Prop
Jaco Bekker (born 1983), South African rugby player
Jan Bekker Teerlink (1759–1832), Dutch plant/seed collector and winemaker, nephew of Betje Wolff
Kees Bekker (1883–1964), Dutch footballer
Kyle Bekker (born 1990), Canadian soccer player 
Marthinus Bekker (born 1980), Inventor and medical engineer 
Martiens Bekker (born 1933) Springbok Rugby Prop
Martiens Bekker (born 1967) International Sculptor.
Martynas Švėgžda von Bekker (b. 1967), Lithuanian violinist
Matthew F. Bekker, American environmental geographer and dendrochronologist
Mieczysław G. Bekker (1905–1989), Polish engineer and scientist
Myfanwy Bekker, South African artist and art teacher
Oliver Bekker (born 1984), South African golf player
Paul Bekker (1882–1937), German music critic
De Bekker
Piet de Bekker (1921–2013), Dutch politician
 (born 1939), Dutch bishop of Paramaribo
Bekkers
Dennis Bekkers (born 1980), Dutch taekwondo practitioner
Wilhelmus Bekkers (1890–1957), Dutch tug of war competitor

See also
Bekker Port, a seaport in Estonia
Bekker Nunataks, Antarctic peaks named after Mieczysław G. Bekker
Bekker numbers, used to cite passages in the extant works of Aristotle, named after A. Immanuel Bekker
Bekker v Jika, an important case in South African property law
Daniëlle Bekkering (b. 1976), Dutch marathon speed skater
Becker (disambiguation), German surname
Bakker, Dutch surname

Afrikaans-language surnames
Dutch-language surnames
Occupational surnames